The Fujifilm FinePix X-S1 is a digital superzoom bridge camera with a 12 megapixel sensor, released in November 2011, and is part of the Fujifilm X-series of higher-end cameras. With a field of view range equivalent of 24-624mm in 35mm format, it has 26 times optical zoom. Its sensor obtained a DxOMark score of 49.

Awards 
The X-S1 won the TIPA Best Superzoom Camera Award in 2012.

Reception 
Photographyblog.com said the X-S1 is a "superzoom camera that can boast similar responsiveness to a DSLR", while DigitalCameraInfo.com stated, "build quality, handling, and user experience are the best that we’ve seen in a superzoom".

References 

Bridge digital cameras
X-S1
Cameras introduced in 2011
Superzoom cameras